Local elections were held in East Timor on 9 October 2009 to elect for Village Chiefs (Chefe do Suco) and delegates for Village Councils (Conselho do Suco) in 442 sucos (villages). It included the election of Hamlet Chiefs (Chefe do Aldeia) in aldeias (communities). Elected officials will serve a six-year term.

On 13 October 2009, although no official parties participated in the election as electoral laws prohibited candidates from representing any political parties, Fretilin claimed victory in the said election saying that they "picked up 56% of positions with another 10% of positions being taken by FRETILIN and allied party shared tickets. In Dili FRETILIN won 60% of the Suco leadership positions."

References

External links
 2009 Election Results

2009 elections in Asia
2009 in East Timor
October 2009 events in Asia
Local elections in East Timor